The name Heling was used for nine tropical cyclones in the Philippines by PAGASA in the Western Pacific Ocean.

 Tropical Depression Heling (1966) – short-lived tropical depression that was only tracked by PAGASA.
 Tropical Storm Violet (1970) (T7008, 9W, Heling) – minimal tropical storm which affected the Philippines and China.
 Severe Tropical Storm Jean (1974) (T7411, 12W, Heling) – moderately strong tropical storm that hit Taiwan and eastern China.
 Tropical Storm Della (1978) (T7812, 13W, Heling) – another tropical storm which hit Taiwan and China.
 Tropical Depression Heling (1982) – weak tropical depression only recognized by PAGASA.
 Typhoon Roger (1986) (T8608, 8W, Heling) – relatively strong typhoon that brushed the coast of Japan.
 Typhoon Becky (1990) (T9016, 16W, Heling) – a typhoon which made landfall in the Philippines and Vietnam, killing at least 32 people.
 Tropical Depression Heling (1994) – another tropical depression that was only monitored by PAGASA.
 Typhoon Yanni (1998) (T9809, 14W, Heling) – skirted the Taiwanese coast as a typhoon before striking South Korea as a tropical storm, claiming 50 lives.

The name Heling was later included in PAGASA's revised list of tropical cyclone names; however, it has been relegated to the auxiliary list for List IV (which was first used in 2004).

Pacific typhoon set index articles